Rhys Brydydd (fl. mid-15th century) was a Welsh language poet from Tir Iarll, Glamorgan, south Wales.

Only four of his compositions survive, all of them cywyddau.

He was either the brother or father of Gwilym Tew and the father of the poet Rhisiart ap Rhys.

Bibliography
Eurys I. Rowlands (ed.), Gwaith Rhys Brydydd a Rhisiart ap Rhys (Cardiff, 1976)

Welsh-language poets
15th-century Welsh poets